Hot Like Wow is the debut album by British recording artist Nadia Oh. It was released in the United Kingdom on 13 April 2008 by Tiger Trax Records. It spawned four singles initially; My Egyptian Lover, Something for the Weekend, Nadia Oh and Got Your Number, all released between 2007–2008. Oh performed gigs in Tokyo to support the album. Although the album's final single was released in 2008, Oh released the album's fifth single, Rip It Up, 29 February 2012 via iTunes.

Background 
Entirely written and produced by Space Cowboy, the album includes two singles of his on which Oh is featured: "My Egyptian Lover", released in January 2007, and "Something 4 the Weekend", released in March 2007. The first and only official single from the album was scheduled to be "Got Your Number",

Got Your Number was featured in the thirteenth episode of the first season of the television series Gossip Girl, entitled "The Thin Line Between Chuck and Nate", originally aired in the US on 9 January 2008 via The CW and in the UK on 19 June 2008 via ITV2. It was also included on the season's soundtrack, OMFGG – Original Music Featured on Gossip Girl No. 1. The song was also featured in the first episode of Japanese drama series Sunao ni Narenakute. "Hot Male" and "Bounce" were featured in an episode of Ugly Betty.

A music video for the track "N.A.D.I.A. O.H." was released on the video-sharing website YouTube. The song "Hot Like Wow" was used in a jazz-pop routine choreographed by Brian Friedman on the fifth season of the American dance reality show So You Think You Can Dance on 17 June 2009. Although the album's final single was released in 2008 'Oh released fifth single, Rip It Up, 29 February 2012 via iTunes.

Singles 
My Egyptian Lover. was released 22 January 2007 as the first single. It peaked within the top 50 and is still her highest charting single. Something for the Weekend followed over a year later released 8 March 2008 in an EP with Hot Like Wow. Third single, N.A.D.I.A. O.H was released later that month to positive reception from her fans, it was however a buzz track and was never official released aside from being purchasable from the album. Got Your Number, served as the first original single, exclusive to the album and was scheduled to be released in the summer of 2008 yet plans fell through where 'Oh proceeded to record her second studio album. Through iTunes fifth single, Rip It Up, was released 29 February 2012 along with an instrumental track.

Track listing 
All tracks are written and produced by Nicolas Dresti.

Release history

References 

2008 debut albums
Nadia Oh albums